Fatimiyya (Arabic: فاطمیة) are days in which Shia Muslims mourn the martyrdom of Fatimah, daughter of the Islamic prophet Muhammad. Fatimiyya is the window between the two possible dates for her death, that is, from 13 Jumada al-Awwal to 3 Jumada al-Thani. In particular, the Fatimiyya period is a total of six days, three days in the month of Jamadi al-Awal and three days in the month of Jumada al-Thani. That is, the first Fatimiyya is 13-15 Jumada al-Awwal and the second Fatimiyya is 3-5 Jamadi al-Thani. Instead of three, some Shia Muslims mourn for ten days.

Time of mourning 

Whilst there is no established convention, periods of Fatimiyya such as "the first ten days" (10-20 Jumada al-Awwal) or "the second ten days" (1-10 Jumada al-Thani) are in recent years increasingly commemorated by Shia Muslims much like the first ten days of Muharram, which are traditionally associated with the martyrdom of Husayn. The prominent place of Fatimah in Islam as daughter of Islamic prophet Muhammad, the hardships she endured in her short life, and that she gave her life to defend the first Shia Imam, Ali, are among the reasons Shia Muslims give for the annual remembrance of Fatimah.

Fatimiyya in other countries 

Apart from Iran and Iraq, Fatimiyya is also observed in other countries, including India, Pakistan, Australia, Azerbaijan, and Tajikistan. There are also events organized in Europe by the Islamic Centre of Hamburg in Germany, the Islamic Centre of England, and others in Sweden and elsewhere.

Differences in date 

The uncertainty about when Fatimah died is often attributed to multiple factors:

 In early Islam, historical events were remembered orally—not in written—which might have led to discrepancies.
 Muslim civil wars might have meant less attention and care in preserving historical records.
 The Arabic script initially lacked any symbols, including punctuation and diacritic. For this reason, seventy (Arabic: سبعون) and ninety (Arabic: تسعون) were written identically, creating a source of ambiguity for later historians who received the narration, "She [Fatimah] died when she was eighteen years old and seventy five days."
The probability of distortion by partial individuals.

See also
Fatimah
Attack on Fatimah's house
Burial place of Fatimah
Children of Muhammad

References 

Fatimah
Shia days of remembrance
Shia Islam
Islamic terminology